The 1910 Tie Cup Final was the final match to decide the winner of the Tie Cup, the 11th. edition of the international competition organised by the Argentine and Uruguayan Associations together. The final was contested by Argentine C.A. Estudiantes and Uruguayan CURCC. This would be the last Tie Cup played by the CURCC before the club dissolved in 1915.

In the match, played at Estadio G.E.B.A. in Belgrano, both teams tied 2–2 so a playoff needed to be played to determine a winner. Nevertheless, the rematch was never scheduled so the trophy was declared desert in 1911.

Qualified teams

Overview 

Estudiantes earned its place in the final after having won the 1910 Copa de Competencia Jockey Club, where the squad beat Argentino de Rosario (1–0 in Palermo), Newell's Old Boys (3–3, 4–3 in Palermo and Rosario respectively), and Gimnasia y Esgrima in the final (3–1 at Ferro C. Oeste). The match was held in Gimnasia y Esgrima Stadium in Palermo (that had been completely refurbished for the Copa Centenario Revolución de Mayo) on 7 August 1910.

Estudiantes took advantage with only 5 seconds played, when forward Maximiliano Susán scored the first goal. The same player scorded again on 5', to put Estudiantes 2–0 over CURCC. Nevertheless, the visitor team (goal by Zibecchi) scored for the 2–1. In the second half, CURCC forced the draw on 12' after a free kick by Zibecchi.

As a strong rain fell during the match, referee Héctor Alfano agreed with both captains to suspend the game on 61 minutes. With the 2–2 result, a playoff was scheduled for August 21 to determine a champion. However, the break up between both associations, AFA and AUF, after the 1910 Copa Lipton match held on August 15 caused the playoff was not carried out. In April 1911 the Cup was officially declared desert with no champion crowned.

Match details 

Suspended at 61' due to rain

Notes

References

t
t
t
t
Football in Buenos Aires